Na Thawi (Pattani Malay: นาวี) is a district (amphoe) in the southern part of Songkhla province, southern Thailand.

History
The area of Na Thawi was separated from Chana district and made a minor district (king amphoe) in 1957.

Geography
Neighboring districts are (from the west clockwise): Sadao, Chana, Thepha, and Saba Yoi. To the south is the state of Kedah, Malaysia.

Administration
The district is divided into 10 sub-districts (tambons), which are further subdivided into 92 villages (mubans). The township (thesaban tambon) Na Thawi covers parts of tambon Na Thawi. There are a further 10 tambon administrative organizations (TAO).

External links 
amphoe.com (in Thai)

Districts of Songkhla province